Wozzeck is the first opera by the Austrian composer Alban Berg. It was composed between 1914 and 1922 and first performed in 1925. The opera is based on the drama Woyzeck, which the German playwright Georg Büchner left incomplete at his death. Berg attended the first production in Vienna of Büchner's play on 5 May 1914, and knew at once that he wanted to base an opera on it. (At the time, the play was still known as Wozzeck, due to an incorrect transcription by Karl Emil Franzos, who was working from a barely-legible manuscript; the correct title would not emerge until 1921.) From the fragments of unordered scenes left by Büchner, Berg selected 15 to form a compact structure of three acts with five scenes each. He adapted the libretto himself, retaining "the essential character of the play, with its many short scenes, its abrupt and sometimes brutal language, and its stark, if haunted, realism..."

The plot depicts the everyday lives of soldiers and the townspeople of a rural German-speaking town. Prominent themes of militarism, callousness, social exploitation, and casual sadism are brutally and uncompromisingly presented. Toward the end of act 1, scene 2, the title character (Wozzeck) murmurs, "Still, all is still, as if the world died," with his fellow soldier Andres muttering, "Night! We must get back!" seemingly oblivious to Wozzeck's words. A funeral march begins, only to transform into the upbeat song of the military marching band in the next scene. Musicologist Glenn Watkins considers this "as vivid a projection of impending world doom as any to come out of the Great War ...."

Composition history

Berg began work on the opera in 1914, but was delayed by the start of World War I and able to devote time to finishing it only while on leave from his regiment in 1917 and 1918. His experience of the war had a pronounced impact on Wozzeck. In a June 1918 letter to his wife, he wrote, "There is a little bit of me in his character, since I have been spending these war years just as dependent on people I hate, have been in chains, sick, captive, resigned, in fact, humiliated." His correspondence and notebooks dating from the war years reveal a painful obsession with completing Wozzeck.

In a draft page of the act 1, scene 2 libretto, Berg included notations in the dialogue that refer to Austrian army bugle calls. These military signals were later inserted into the score in a modified, slightly atonal form, but were still likely recognizable to Austrian audiences of the period. The scene of snoring soldiers in the barracks during act 2, scene 5 was influenced by Berg's similar such experience: "this polyphonic breathing, gasping, and groaning is the most peculiar chorus I've ever heard. It is like some primeval music that wells up from the abysses of the soul ..."

In 1916, Berg devoted himself to attaining the rank of Einjährig-Freiwillige Korporal (Corporal), which he did later that year. During this period, as he wrote to his wife, "For months I haven't done any work on Wozzeck. Everything suffocated. Buried!" Finishing act 1 by the summer of 1919, act 2 in August 1921, and the final act during the following two months (with orchestration finalized over the following six months), Berg completed Wozzeck in April 1922. For the climactic section, he used one of his old student pieces in D minor.

Performance history
Erich Kleiber, "who programmed (the opera) on his own initiative", conducted the world premiere at the Berlin State Opera on 14 December 1925. Walsh claims that it was "a succès de scandale with disturbances during the performance and a mixed press afterwards, but it led to a stream of productions in Germany and Austria, before the Nazis consigned it to the dustbin of 'degenerate art' after 1933". Initially, Wozzeck established a solid place for itself in the mainstream operatic tradition and quickly became so well-established in the repertoire of the major European opera houses that Berg found himself able to live a comfortable life off the royalties. He spent a good deal of his time through the 1920s and 30s travelling to attend performances and to give talks about the opera.

The Philadelphia Grand Opera Company gave Wozzecks American premiere on 19 March 1931 at the Philadelphia Metropolitan Opera House, with Leopold Stokowski conducting.

Arnold Schoenberg's former pupil, the conductor and BBC programme planner Edward Clark, produced a broadcast of fragments of the work in a studio concert on 13 May 1932, with the BBC Symphony Orchestra under Sir Henry Wood. On 14 March 1934 in the Queen's Hall, Adrian Boult conducted a complete concert performance of Wozzeck, again produced by Edward Clark. The opera was given its first British staged performance at the Royal Opera House, Covent Garden, on 22 January 1952.

A typical performance of the work takes slightly over an hour and a half.

Musical style and structure

Wozzeck is generally regarded as the first opera produced in the 20th-century avant-garde style and is also one of the most famous examples of atonality (music that avoids establishing a key) and Sprechgesang. Berg was following in the footsteps of his teacher, Schoenberg, by using free atonality to express emotions and even the thought processes of the characters on the stage. The expression of madness and alienation was amplified with atonal music.

The music is atonal: it does not follow the techniques of the major/minor tonality system dominant in the West during the Baroque, Classical, and Romantic periods. It uses other methods of controlling pitch to direct the harmony; the tritone B–F, for example, represents Wozzeck and Marie, permanently in a struggle with one another. The combination of B and D (a minor third) represents the link between Marie and the child. In this way, the opera continually returns to certain pitches to mark crucial moments in the plot. This is not the same as a key center, but over time the repetition of these pitches establishes continuity and structure.

Leitmotifs
The opera uses a variety of musical techniques to create unity and coherence. The first is leitmotifs. As with most examples of this method, each leitmotif is used in a much subtler manner than being directly attached to a character or object. Still, motifs for the Captain, the Doctor and the Drum Major are very prominent. Wozzeck is clearly associated with two motifs, one often heard as he rushes on or off stage, the other more languidly expressing his misery and helplessness in the face of the pressures he experiences. Marie is accompanied by motifs that express her sensuality, as when she accepts a pair of earrings from the Drum Major. A motif not linked to a physical object is the pair of chords that close each act, used in an oscillating repetition until they almost blur into one another.

The most significant motif is first heard sung by Wozzeck (in the first scene with the Captain), to the words "" ("we poor folks"). Tracing out a minor chord with added major seventh, it is frequently heard as the signal of the characters' inability to transcend their situation.

Berg also reuses motifs from set pieces heard earlier in the opera to give insight into characters' thoughts. For example, the reappearance of military band music in the last scene of act 1 informs the audience that Marie is musing on the Drum Major's attractiveness.

An almost imperceptible leitmotif is the single pitch B, symbolizing the murder. It is first heard  at the very end of act 2, after Wozzeck's humiliation, after his words "" ("one after another"), and grows increasingly insistent during the murder scene, with Marie's last cry for help a two-octave jump from B5 to B3, until after the murder, when the whole orchestra explodes through a prolonged crescendo on this note, first in unison on B3, then spread across the whole range of the orchestra in octaves.

Classic forms
Berg decided not to use classic operatic forms such as aria or trio. Instead, each scene is given its own inner coherence by the use of forms more commonly associated with abstract instrumental music. The second scene of act 2 (during which the Doctor and Captain taunt Wozzeck about Marie's infidelity), for instance, consists of a prelude and triple fugue. The fourth scene of act 1, focusing on Wozzeck and the Doctor, is a passacaglia.

The scenes of the third act move beyond these structures and adopt novel strategies. Each scene is a set of variations, but not necessarily on a melody. Thus, scene two is a variation on a single note, B, which is heard continuously in the scene, and the only note heard in the powerful orchestral crescendos at the end of act 3, scene 2. Scene 3 is a variation on a rhythmic pattern, with every major thematic element constructed around this pattern. Scene 4 is a variation on a chord, used exclusively for the whole scene. The following orchestral interlude is a freely composed passage firmly grounded in D minor. Finally, the last scene is a moto perpetuo, a variation on a single rhythm (the quaver).

The table below summarizes the dramatic action and forms as prepared by Fritz Mahler.

{| class="wikitable" align="center" style="margin-right: 0;"
|-
! width="190" style="background: Silver" | Drama
! width="65" style="background: Silver"  |
! width="215" style="background: Silver" | Music
|-
! align="center" | Expositions
! align="center" | Act 1
! align="center" | Five character pieces
|-
| Wozzeck and the Captain
| align="center" | Scene 1
| align="center" | Suite
|-
| Wozzeck and Andres
| align="center" | Scene 2
| align="center" | Rhapsody
|-
| Wozzeck and Marie
| align="center" | Scene 3
| align="center" | Military March and Lullaby
|-
| Wozzeck and the Doctor
| align="center" | Scene 4
| align="center" | Passacaglia
|-
| Marie and the Drum Major
| align="center" | Scene 5
| align="center" | Andante affettuoso (quasi Rondo)
|-
! align="center" | Dramatic development
! align="center" | Act 2
! align="center" | Symphony in five movements
|-
| Marie and her child, later Wozzeck
| align="center" | Scene 1
| align="center" | Sonata movement
|-
| The Captain and the Doctor, later Wozzeck
| align="center" | Scene 2
| align="center" | Fantasia and fugue
|-
| Marie and Wozzeck
| align="center" | Scene 3
| align="center" | Largo
|-
| Garden of a tavern
| align="center" | Scene 4
| align="center" | Scherzo
|-
| Guard room in the barracks
| align="center" | Scene 5
| align="center" | Rondo con introduzione
|-
! align="center" | Catastrophe and epilogue
! align="center" | Act 3
! align="center" | Six inventions
|-
| Marie and her child
| align="center" | Scene 1
| align="center" | Invention on a theme
|-
| Marie and Wozzeck
| align="center" | Scene 2
| align="center" | Invention on a note (B)
|-
| Tavern
| align="center" | Scene 3
| align="center" | Invention on a rhythm
|-
| Death of Wozzeck
| align="center" | Scene 4
| align="center" | Invention on a hexachord
|-
|
| align="center" | Interlude
| align="center" | Invention on a key (D minor)
|-
| Children playing
| align="center" | Scene 5
| align="center" | Invention on a regular quaver movement
|}

Roles
{| class="wikitable"
|+
!Role
!Voice type
!Premiere cast, 14 December 1925Conductor: Erich Kleiber
|-
|Wozzeck
|baritone
|Leo Schützendorf
|-
|Marie, his common-law wife
|soprano
|Sigrid Johanson
|-
|Marie's son
|treble
|Ruth Iris Witting
|-
|Captain
|buffo tenor
|Waldemar Henke
|-
|Doctor
|buffo bass
|Martin Abendroth
|-
|Drum Major
|heldentenor
|Fritz Soot
|-
|Andres, Wozzeck's friend
|lyric tenor
|Gerhard Witting
|-
|Margret, Marie's neighbor
|contralto
|Jessika Koettrik
|-
|First Apprentice
|deep bass
|Ernst Osterkamp
|-
|Second Apprentice
|high baritone
|Alfred Borchardt
|-
|Madman
|high tenor
|Marcel Noé
|-
|A Soldier
|baritone
|Leonhard Kern
|-
| colspan="3" |Soldiers, apprentices, women, children
|}

Synopsis

Act 1
Scene 1 (Suite)

Wozzeck is shaving the Captain, who lectures him on the qualities of a "decent man" and taunts him for living an immoral life. Wozzeck slavishly replies, "Jawohl, Herr Hauptmann" ("Yes sir, Captain") repeatedly to the Captain's abuse. But when the Captain scorns Wozzeck for having a child "without the blessing of the Church", Wozzeck protests that it is difficult to be virtuous when one is poor, and entreats the Captain to remember the lesson from the gospel, "Lasset die Kleinen zu mir kommen!" ("Suffer the little children to come unto me," Mark 10:14). The Captain is confounded by Wozzeck's theological knowledge and anxiously squeaks, "What do you mean? And what sort of curious answer is that? You make me quite confused!" Wozzeck continues the discussion by positing that it would be easy to be moral if he were wealthy and that, if the poor ever "got to Heaven, we'd all have to manufacture thunder!" The flustered Captain, unable to comprehend Wozzeck, finally concedes that he is "a decent man, only you think too much!" The Captain concludes the discussion, saying it has "quite fatigued" him and again chides Wozzeck to walk slowly before finally exiting.

Scene 2 (Rhapsody and Hunting Song)

Wozzeck and Andres are cutting sticks as the sun is setting. Wozzeck has frightening visions and Andres tries unsuccessfully to calm him.

Scene 3 (March and Lullaby)

A military parade passes by outside Marie's room. Margret taunts Marie for flirting with the soldiers. Marie shuts the window and sings a lullaby to her son. Wozzeck then comes by and tells Marie of the terrible visions he has had, promptly leaving without seeing their son, much to Marie's dismay. She laments being poor.

Scene 4 (Passacaglia)

The Doctor scolds Wozzeck for not following his instructions regarding diet and behavior. But when the Doctor hears of Wozzeck's mental aberrations, he is delighted and congratulates himself on the success of his experiment.

Scene 5 (Rondo)

Marie admires the Drum Major outside her room. He makes advances on her, which she first rejects but then accepts after a short struggle.

Act 2
Scene 1 (Sonata-Allegro)

Marie is telling her child to go to sleep while admiring earrings the Drum Major gave her. She is startled when Wozzeck arrives. He asks where she got the earrings, and she says she found them. Though not convinced, Wozzeck gives her some money and leaves. Marie chastises herself for her behavior.

Scene 2 (Fantasia and Fugue on 3 Themes)

The Doctor rushes by the Captain in the street, who urges him to slow down. The Doctor then proceeds to scare the Captain by speculating about what afflictions he may have. When Wozzeck comes by, they insinuate that Marie is being unfaithful to him.

Scene 3 (Largo)

Wozzeck confronts Marie, who does not deny his suspicions. Enraged, Wozzeck is about to hit her when she stops him, saying even her father never dared lay a hand on her. Her statement "better a knife in my belly than your hands on me" plants in Wozzeck's mind the idea for his revenge.

Scene 4 (Scherzo)

Among a crowd, Wozzeck sees Marie dancing with the Drum Major. After a brief hunter's chorus, Andres asks Wozzeck why he is sitting by himself. An Apprentice delivers a drunken sermon, then an Idiot approaches Wozzeck and cries out that the scene is "Lustig, lustig...aber es riecht ...Ich riech, ich riech Blut!" ("joyful, joyful, but it reeks...I smell, I smell blood").

Scene 5 (Rondo)

In the barracks at night, Wozzeck, unable to sleep, is keeping Andres awake. The Drum Major comes in, intoxicated, and rouses Wozzeck out of bed to fight with him.

Act 3
Scene 1 (Invention on a Theme)

In her room at night, Marie reads to herself from the Bible. She cries out that she wants forgiveness.

Scene 2 (Invention on a Single Note (B))

Wozzeck and Marie are walking in the woods by a pond. Marie is anxious to leave, but Wozzeck restrains her. As a blood-red moon rises, Wozzeck says that if he can't have Marie, no one else can, and stabs her.

Scene 3 (Invention on a Rhythm)

People are dancing in a tavern. Wozzeck enters, and upon seeing Margret, dances with her and pulls her onto his lap. He insults her, and then asks her to sing him a song. She sings, but then notices blood on his hand and elbow; everyone begins shouting at him, and Wozzeck, agitated and obsessed with the blood, rushes out of the tavern.

Scene 4 (Invention on a Hexachord)

Having returned to the murder scene, Wozzeck becomes obsessed with the thought that the knife he killed Marie with will incriminate him, and throws it into the pond. When the blood-red moon appears again, Wozzeck, fearing that he has not thrown the knife far enough from shore and also wanting to wash away the blood staining his clothing and hands, wades into the pond and drowns. The Captain and the Doctor, passing by, hear Wozzeck moaning and rush off in fright.

Interlude (Invention on a Key (D minor))

This interlude leads to the finale.

Scene 5 (Invention on an Eighth-Note moto perpetuo, quasi toccata) 

The next morning, children are playing in the sunshine. The news spreads that Marie's body has been found, and they all run off to see, except for Marie's son, who after an oblivious moment, follows after the others.

Instrumentation
Wozzeck uses a fairly large orchestra and has three onstage ensembles in addition to the pit orchestra (a marching band in act 1, scene 3; a chamber orchestra in act 2, scene 3; and a tavern band in act 2, scene 4; an upright piano is also played in act 3, scene 3). The instrumentation is:

Pit orchestra

Woodwinds
 4 flutes (all double piccolos)
 4 oboes (4th doubles English horn)
 
 1 bass clarinet in B
 3 bassoons
 1 contrabassoon

Brass
 4 horns in F
 4 trumpets in F
 4 trombones (1 alto, 2 tenor, 1 bass)
 1 tuba

Percussion
 4 timpani
 2 bass drums (one with rute)
 
 snare drum
 2 tam-tams (one smaller than the other)
 triangle
 xylophone

Keyboards
 celesta

Strings
 harp
 violins I
 violins II
 violas
 cellos
 double basses

Special groupsMarching band (Act I, scene iii):

Woodwinds
 1 piccolo
 2 flutes
 2 oboes
 2 clarinets in E
 2 bassoons

Brass
 2 horns in F
 2 trumpets in F
 3 trombones
 1 tuba

Percussion
 bass drum with cymbals
 snare drum
 triangle

Berg notes that marching band members may be taken from the pit orchestra, indicating exactly where the players can leave with a footnote near the end of Act I, scene ii.Tavern band (Act II, scene iv):

Woodwinds
 1 clarinet in C

Brass
 1 bombardon in F (or tuba, if it can be muted)

Keyboard
 accordion

Strings
 guitar
 2 fiddles (violins with steel strings)

In addition, for the Tavern scene in Act III, scene iii, Berg calls for an out-of-tune upright piano.Chamber orchestra (Act II, scene iii):

Woodwinds
 1 flute (doubling piccolo)
 1 oboe,
 1 English horn
 1 clarinet in E
 1 clarinet in A
 1 bass clarinet in B
 1 bassoon
 1 contrabassoon

Brass
 2 horns

Strings
 2 violins
 1 viola
 1 violoncello
 1 double bass

The instrumentation matches that of Schoenberg's Chamber Symphony No. 1.

Other versions of Wozzeck
There are several different versions of Wozzeck in the opera repertoire apart from Berg's. German composer Manfred Gurlitt's Wozzeck, also based on Büchner's play, was first performed four months after Berg's work. Gurlitt's Wozzeck, which was created without any knowledge of Berg's, has remained in its shadow.

Arrangements of Berg's setting include one for 22 singers and 21 instrumental parts by Canadian composer John Rea and one for a reduced orchestra of about 60 players for smaller theatres by composer and fellow Schoenberg student Erwin Stein in collaboration with Berg.

Influences
The orchestra's rising chords during Wozzeck's drowning are quoted in Luciano Berio's Sinfonia (1968–69).

Recordings
Roman Trekel (Wozzeck), Anne Schwanewilms (Marie), Gordon Gietz (Tambourmajor), Nathan Berg (Doktor), Robert McPherson (Andres), Marc Molomot (Hauptmann), Katherine Ciesinski (Margret), Houston Grand Opera Children's Chorus, Chorus of Students and Alumni, Shepherd School of Music, Rice University, Houston Symphony, conducted by Hans Graf. Label: Naxos, 2017.
 Franz Hawlata (Wozzeck), Angela Denoke (Marie), Reiner Goldberg (Tambourmajor), Johann Tilli (Doktor), Hubert Delamboye (Hauptmann), Vivian Tierney (Margret), Vivaldi Chorus; IPSI; Petits Cantors de Catalunya; Orchestra & Chorus of the Gran Teatre del Liceu, conducted by Sebastian Weigle, directed by Calixto Bieito. Label: Opus Arte, 2006.
Franz Grundheber (Wozzeck), Waltraud Meier (Marie), Mark Baker (Tambourmajor), Endrik Wottrich (Andres), Graham Clark (Hauptmann), Günter von Kannen (Doktor), Dalia Schaechter (Margret), Chorus and Children's Choir of the Deutsche Oper Berlin, Staatskapelle Berlin, conducted by Daniel Barenboim, Label: Teldec, 1994.
Franz Grundheber (Wozzeck), Hildegard Behrens (Marie), Walter Raffeiner (Tambourmajor), Philip Langridge (Andres), Heinz Zednik (Hauptmann), Aage Haugland (Doktor), Anna Gonda (Margret), Wiener Staatsopernchor, Vienna Philharmonic, conducted by Claudio Abbado, Label: Deutsche Grammophon, 1987.
 Eberhard Waechter (Wozzeck), Anja Silja (Marie), Hermann Winkler (Tambourmajor), Horst Laubenthal (Andres), Heinz Zednik (Hauptmann), Alexander Malta (Doktor), Gertrude Jahn (Margret), Wiener Staatsopernchor, Vienna Philharmonic, conducted by Christoph von Dohnányi, Label: Decca, 1979.
Toni Blankenheim (Wozzeck), Sena Jurinac (Marie), Richard Cassilly (Tambourmajor), Peter Haage (Andres), Gerhard Unger (Hauptmann), Hans Sotin (Doktor), Elisabeth Steiner (Margret), Chorus of the Hamburg State Opera, Hamburg Philharmonic State Orchestra, conducted by Bruno Maderna, directed by Rolf Liebermann, Label: Arthaus Musik, 1970.
Walter Berry (Wozzeck), Isabel Strauss (Marie), Fritz Uhl (Tambourmajor), Richard van Vrooman (Andres), Albert Weikenmeier (Hauptmann), Karl Dönch (Doktor), Ingeborg Lasser (Margret), Chorus and Orchestra of the Paris Opera, conducted by Pierre Boulez, Label: Columbia, 1966.
 Dietrich Fischer-Dieskau (Wozzeck), Evelyn Lear (Marie), Helmut Melchert (Tambourmajor), Fritz Wunderlich (Andres), Gerhard Stolze (Hauptmann), Karl-Christian Kohn (Doktor), Alice Oelke (Margret), Chorus and Orchestra of the Deutsche Oper Berlin, conducted by Karl Böhm, Label: Deutsche Grammophon, 1965.
 Tito Gobbi (Wozzeck), Dorothy Dow (Marie), Mirto Picchi (Tambourmajor), Italo Tajo (Doktor), Petre Munteanu (Andres), Hugues Cuénod (Hauptmann), Maria Teresa Mandalari (Margret), RAI Chorus and Symphony Orchestra of Rome, conducted by Nino Sanzogno, Label: /RAI/Myto, 1955 (sung in Italian). 
 Mack Harrell (Wozzeck), Eileen Farrell (Marie), Frederick Jagel (Tambourmajor), David Lloyd (Andres), Joseph Mordino (Hauptmann, Soldat, Idiot), Ralph Herbert (Doktor), Edwina Eustis (Margret), New York Philharmonic, conducted by Dimitri Mitropoulos, Label: Columbia (FCX 157–FCX 158), 1951.

Film adaptation
The 1970 Hamburg State Opera production was filmed for the 1972 TV film Wozzeck, directed by Joachim Hess and broadcast on Norddeutscher Rundfunk. Filming was done in and around a deserted castle.

ReferencesCited sources 
 
 Other sources'''
 Adorno, Theodor W. (1991), Alban Berg: Master of the Smallest Link. Trans. Juliane Brand and Christopher Hailey. Cambridge: Cambridge University Press. 
Bonds, M. E. (2020). “Wozzeck’s Worst Hours”: Alban Berg’s Presentation Copy of Wozzeck to Eduard Steuermann. Notes, 76(4), 527–534.
 Hall, Patricia (2011), "Berg's Wozzeck". Studies in Musical Genesis, Structure, and Interpretation. New York: Oxford University Press.  | www.oup.com/us/bergswozzeck; Username: Music2 Password: Book4416 (accessed 29 October 2012)
 Jarman, Douglas (1979), The Music of Alban Berg. London and Boston: Faber & Faber  ; Berkeley: University of California Press. 
 Jarman, Douglas (1989), "Alban Berg, Wozzeck". Cambridge Opera Handbooks. Cambridge: Cambridge University Press.  (cloth)  (pbk)
 Perle, George (1980), The Operas of Alban Berg, Vol 1: "Wozzeck". Berkeley: University of California Press. 
 Schmalfeldt, Janet (1983), "Berg's Wozzeck", Harmonic Language and Dramatic Design''. New Haven: Yale University Press

External links
 
 
 
 Portrait of the opera in the online opera guide opera-inside.com

Atonal compositions
Operas by Alban Berg
German-language operas
Music dramas
1925 operas
Operas
Opera world premieres at the Berlin State Opera
Expressionist music
Adultery in theatre
Operas based on plays
Works based on Woyzeck

Compositions that use extended techniques